The tables list the Malayalam films released in theaters in the year 2013. Premiere shows and film festival screenings are not considered as releases for this list.

Malayalam films

Dubbed films

Notable deaths

References

2013
 2013
Malayalam
Malayalam